Paul Johannes George Tang (born 23 April 1967) is a Dutch politician who has been serving as a Member of the European Parliament (MEP) since 2014. He is a member of the Labour Party, part of the Progressive Alliance of Socialists and Democrats. Between 2007 and 2010 Tang was member of the House of Representatives of the Netherlands.

Early life
Paul Johannes George Tang was born on 23 April 1967 in Haarlem in the Netherlands.

Tang studied economics at the University of Amsterdam between 1985 and 1991, graduating cum laude. Afterwards he worked as assistant at Tilburg University and as trainee researcher at the University of Amsterdam.

Between 1995 and 2005 he was employee at the Bureau for Economic Policy Analysis. In 2001 he earned a doctorate in economic sciences from the University of Amsterdam. He moved on to the Dutch Ministry of Economic Affairs where he was deputy director of General Economic Policies between September 2005 and March 2007.

Political career

House of Representatives
In the Netherlands general election of 2006 he was on the candidate list of the Labour Party. He was not directly elected, but after some Labour members of the House of Representatives moved towards the cabinet, Tang took up membership of the House. In the House he dealt with fiscal and financial policies. Among them was the Icesave dispute and the role of the De Nederlandsche Bank in it. In 2008 Tang was verbally reprimanded by President of the House of Representatives, Gerdi Verbeet, after speaking publicly about the then still secret  (Dutch government financial prospects). 

In 2009, he leaked some of the financial prospect papers to RTL Nieuws. The Labour Party took away his speaking rights on his topics in the House for one month. In 2010, he did not seek re-election.

European Parliament

In the internal Labour Party elections Tang was chosen to be lijsttrekker (top party candidate) in the European Parliament elections of 2014. With 52% of the votes, he was elected in May 2014 to the European Parliament.

In Parliament, Tang has been serving of the Committee on Economic and Monetary Affairs since 2014. He was also a member of the Committee on Budgets (2014-2019) and the Special Committee on Tax Rulings and Other Measures Similar in Nature or Effect (2015-2016). He has been particularly active on policies files related to the Common Consolidated Corporation Tax Base (CCCTB), sustainable finance and Digital Services Tax.  

In May 2019, after the failure of drafting EU-legislation to tax tech companies, Tang presented together with Henk Nijboer, MP of the Dutch House of Representatives, an own-initiative bill for a Dutch Digital services tax. The proposal hasn't yet been discussed in Parliament.

In addition to his committee assignments, Tang has served as vice-chair on the EU-Serbia Stabilisation and Association Parliamentary Committee (2014-2019) and as member of the delegation for relations with the United States (since 2019).

In May 2019 Tang was re-elected to the European Parliament. The Labour Party obtained, with Frans Timmermans as top party candidate, six of the 26 Dutch seats in Parliament. Tang became again a member of the Committee on Economic and Monetary Affairs, but also substitute member of the European Parliament Committee on Civil Liberties, Justice and Home Affairs. Since his re-election, he also became a member of the European Internet Forum and the European Parliament Intergroup on Anti-Corruption.

After being re-elected, Tang told a Dutch newspaper he wants to focus this mandate on taxation, sustainable finance and data (protection). In 2020, he also joined the Subcommittee on Tax Matters.

In the first months of the new mandate, Tang became shadow rapporteur on behalf of the S&D on the EU Taxonomy-proposal, which is part of the EU Action Plan on Sustainable Finance.

Political positions
Prior to being elected, Tang argued in March 2014 that top EU officials should not earn more than ten times the wage of the lowest paid EU employees. He also argued that the EU was impeding the economic growth of Europe, and argued for stricter supervision on banks in the EU and for reforms in the sector.

References

External links

  Paul Tang at the website of the Labour Party
 Paul Tang at the website of the European Parliament

1967 births
Labour Party (Netherlands) MEPs
Labour Party (Netherlands) politicians
Living people
Members of the House of Representatives (Netherlands)
MEPs for the Netherlands 2014–2019
Politicians from Haarlem
University of Amsterdam alumni
MEPs for the Netherlands 2019–2024
Academic staff of Tilburg University
People from Alkmaar